Lock and Dam 53 was the 20th lock and dam upstream from the confluence of the  Ohio River and the Mississippi River. It was located 962 miles downstream from Pittsburgh. Lock and Dam 53 had two locks for commercial barge traffic, one that was 1,200 feet long by 110 feet wide, the other 600 feet long by 110 feet wide. The lock will be demolished and Olmsted Lock and Dam will replace it.

According to the New York Times, in 2015 72.3 million tonnes of cargo transitted the lock, making it the second biggest and most economically important, in the United States, after nearby Lock and Dam Number 52.

According to the New York Times, the Olmsted project was scheduled to have been completed in 1998.  In November 2016, the New York Times reported the Olmsted project was then scheduled to be complete in October 2018.  The project's cost had ballooned from $775 million to $2.9 billion.

The New York Times reports that the United States Army Corps of Engineers, the Federal agency responsible for maintaining navigation on the USA's rivers, the delay in replacing the lock complex with the Olmsted project costs $640 million per year.

See also
 List of locks and dams of the Ohio River
 List of locks and dams of the Upper Mississippi River

References

External links
U.S. Army Corps of Engineers, Pittsburgh District
U.S. Army Corps of Engineers, Huntington District
U.S. Army Corps of Engineers, Louisville District

Dams on the Ohio River
Dams in Kentucky
Dams in Illinois
Dams completed in 1929
Locks of Kentucky
Locks of Illinois